The Sellersburg Limestone is a geologic formation in Kentucky. It preserves fossils dating back to the Devonian period.

See also

 List of fossiliferous stratigraphic units in Kentucky

References
 

Devonian Kentucky